John Redmond Anthony (13 August 1885 – 6 November 1964) was an Irish hurler who played in numerous positions for the Kilkenny senior team.

Anthony made his first appearance for the team during the 1904 championship and was a regular member of the starting fifteen for the next three seasons until his retirement after the 1907 championship. During that time he won three All-Ireland medal and three Leinster medals.

References

1885 births
1964 deaths
Piltown hurlers
Kilkenny inter-county hurlers
All-Ireland Senior Hurling Championship winners